Karatoulas is a village in the municipality of Megalopoli, Arcadia, Greece. It is situated on a hillside in the southwestern foothills of the Mainalo mountains, at about 750 m elevation. It is 2 km northwest of Vangos, 3 km southeast of Lykochia and 9 km northeast of Megalopoli.  Karatoulas had a population of 28 in 2011.

Population

See also
List of settlements in Arcadia

References

External links
History and information about Karatoulas
 Karatoulas GTP Travel Pages

Megalopolis, Greece
Populated places in Arcadia, Peloponnese